Aggrey Morris Ambros (born 12 March 1984) is a Tanzanian footballer from Zanzibar who plays for Azam in the Tanzanian Premier League and is member of the Tanzania national football team.

Career 
Morris started his career of the Island of Zanzibar with Mafunzo F.C., before joined in 2009 to Azzam United. In March 2012 was named as player of the year in the season 2011/2012.<ref>{{Cite news|url=http://en.starafrica.com/football/tanzanias-aggrey-morris-picks-best-foo-240751.html|archive-url=https://archive.today/20140702045433/http://en.starafrica.com/football/tanzanias-aggrey-morris-picks-best-foo-240751.html|url-status=dead|archive-date=2014-07-02|title=Tanzanias Aggrey Morris picks best footballer's season Award - Foot…|date=2014-07-02|work=archive.is|access-date=2018-05-22}}</ref>

 International 
Aggrey is a member of Tanzania national football team. He presented also fifteen times the Zanzibar national football team.

International goals for ZanzibarScores and results list Zanzibar's goal tally first. 

International goals for TanzaniaScores and results list Tanzania's goal tally first.''

References 

1984 births
Living people
Zanzibari footballers
Tanzanian footballers
Association football defenders
Tanzania international footballers
Zanzibar international footballers
Azam F.C. players